This Is for You, John is an album by saxophonist/composer Benny Golson that was recorded in 1983 and released on the Japanese Baystate label the following year. The album features saxophonist Pharoah Sanders performing tunes associated with, or inspired by, John Coltrane and was reissued on the Dutch Timeless label in 1986.

Reception

The AllMusic review by Steve Loewy said "While Sanders might seem a strange stylistic choice due to his scorching, free-style performances with Coltrane, he is, in fact, the only one of this group who recorded regularly with Coltrane, and he performs here totally within the hard bop context of the recording. Golson carefully chooses the tunes, including the lovely "Greensleeves," as well as four by Golson and one by Sanders. Most relate to Trane in some way, although Golson wisely eschews any kind of retrospective. Thankfully, too, the saxophonists never engage in any cutting, so the results are uniformly delightful, if somewhat conservative".

Track listing 
All compositions by Benny Golson except where noted
 "Jam the Avenue" – 5:01
 "Greensleeves" (Traditional) – 6:28
 "Origin" (Pharoah Sanders) – 4:25
 "A Change of Heart" – 7:25
 "Times Past (This Is for You, John)" – 7:55
 "Page 12" – 5:25
 "Vilia" (Franz Lehár) – 6:21

Personnel 
Benny Golson, Pharoah Sanders – tenor saxophone
Cedar Walton – piano
Ron Carter - bass 
Jack DeJohnette – drums

Production
Benny Golson, Fumimaru Kawashima – producer
David Baker – engineer

References 

Benny Golson albums
John Coltrane tribute albums
1984 albums
Baystate Records albums
Timeless Records albums